Salimabad (also Romanized as Salīmābād; also known as Salmābād) is a village in Khenejin Rural District, in the Central District of Komijan County, Markazi Province, Iran. At the 2006 census, its population was 1,020, in 264 families.

References 

Populated places in Komijan County